Ak Komelik  is a populated place located in Pima County, Arizona. It is a village in the area of the Baboquivari Peak Wilderness in the Papago Indian Reservation. The name means "flats" in the Papago language. The Jesuit missionary Eusebio Kino is believed to have visited the village in 1698 and called it "Cubit Tubig".

References

Unincorporated communities in Pima County, Arizona
Unincorporated communities in Arizona